Clinton is an English toponymic surname, indicating one's ancestors came from English places called Glympton or Glinton. Clinton has frequently been used as a given name since the late 19th century. Baron Clinton is a title of peerage in England, originally created in 1298.  

Notable people with the name Clinton include:

Family of Bill and Hillary Clinton

 Roger Clinton Sr. (1908–1967), step-father of Bill Clinton
 Virginia Clinton (1923–1994), mother of Bill Clinton
 Roger Clinton Jr. (born 1956), maternal half-brother of Bill Clinton
 Bill Clinton (born 1946), 42nd president of the United States 
 Hillary Clinton (born 1947), née Rodham, 67th U.S. secretary of state, U.S. senator from New York, 2016 Democratic presidential nominee, and wife of Bill Clinton
 Chelsea Clinton (born 1980), daughter of Bill and Hillary Clinton

Family of George Clinton
 Charles Clinton (1690–1773), French and Indian War colonel, father of James and George Clinton
 James Clinton (1733–1812), American Revolutionary War general, father of DeWitt and brother of George Clinton
 George Clinton (vice president) (1739–1812), 4th vice president of the United States and 1st governor of New York
 DeWitt Clinton (1769–1828), 6th governor of New York and 47th mayor of New York City, son of James and nephew of George Clinton
 George Clinton Jr. (1771–1809), member of U.S. House of Representatives from New York, son of George Clinton
 George W. Clinton (1807–1885), 12th mayor of Buffalo, New York, son of DeWitt Clinton

Family of Sir Henry Clinton
 Admiral George Clinton (Royal Navy officer) (1686–1761), British naval officer and colonial governor
 General Henry Clinton (British Army officer, born 1730) (died 1795), British general during the American Revolutionary War
 General William Henry Clinton (1769–1846), British general during the Napoleonic Wars
 Lieutenant General Henry Clinton (British Army officer, born 1771) (died 1829), British general during the Napoleonic Wars

Other notable people with the surname 
 Bessie Clinton, née Bessie Blount, mistress of Henry VIII and wife of Edward Clinton, 1st Earl of Lincoln
 Catherine Clinton (born 1962), American history professor
 Clifford Clinton (1900–1969), American restaurateur
 David Clinton (born 1960), American Bicycle Motocross (BMX) racer
 Edward Clinton, 1st Earl of Lincoln (1512–1585), English admiral
 George Clinton (disambiguation), multiple people
 Gordon S. Clinton (1920–2011), 43rd mayor of Seattle
 Henry Clinton (disambiguation), multiple people
 Henry Fynes Clinton (1781–1852), British classical scholar and chronologist of the 19th century
 Jerry Clinton (1937–2003), professor of Persian language and literature
 Joel Clinton (born 1981), Australian rugby league player
 John Clinton, 1st Baron Clinton (died 1315), English knight
 Joseph Clinton, American engineer
 Kate Clinton (born 1947), American comedian
 Larry Clinton (1909–1985), American trumpeter
 Lou Clinton (1937–1997), American baseball player
 Mark Clinton (1915–2001), Irish politician
 Mary Clinton (born 1960), New Zealand field hockey
 Richard Clinton (cricketer) (born 1981), English cricketer
 Richard Clinton (politician) (1741–1795), American military officer and politician
 Sam Houston Clinton (1923–2004), American judge

People with the given name
 See Clinton (given name).

See also
 McClinton (disambiguation)

References

Surnames of English origin
English toponymic surnames
English given names
English masculine given names